Bordertown Gun Fighters is a 1943 American Western film directed by Howard Bretherton and written by Norman S. Hall. The film stars Wild Bill Elliott, George "Gabby" Hayes, Anne Jeffreys, Ian Keith, Harry Woods and Edward Earle. The film was released on July 8, 1943, by Republic Pictures.

Plot

Cast  
Wild Bill Elliott as Wild Bill Elliott 
George "Gabby" Hayes as Gabby Hayes
Anne Jeffreys as Anita Shelby
Ian Keith as Cameo Shelby
Harry Woods as Dave Strickland
Edward Earle as Dan Forrester
Karl Hackett as Frank Holden
Roy Barcroft as Jack Gatling
Bud Geary as Henchman Buck
Carl Sepulveda as Henchman

References

External links
 

1943 films
American Western (genre) films
1943 Western (genre) films
Republic Pictures films
Films directed by Howard Bretherton
American black-and-white films
1940s English-language films
1940s American films